Giraumont may refer to the following places in France:

 Giraumont, Meurthe-et-Moselle, a commune in the Meurthe-et-Moselle department
 Giraumont, Oise, a commune in the Oise department